David Elson (born August 26, 1971) is an American football coach. He is the linebackers coach, and was previously a quality control coach, at Purdue University, a position he has held since 2021. Elson served as head football coach at Western Kentucky University (WKU) from  2003 to 2009.  He oversaw the transition of Western Kentucky  from a Football Championship Subdivision (formerly known as Division I-AA) to a Football Bowl Subdivision (formerly known as Division I-A) program, the highest division in college football; in his final season, the Hilltoppers joined the Sun Belt Conference.

Coaching career
Elson joined the Hilltoppers staff as a defensive backs coach in 1996. He served as defensive coordinator for the 2001 and 2002 season before he was promoted to head coach.  The rise to college football's highest level was difficult for the program, and Hilltoppers went 2-20 in Elson's final two seasons.

On November 9, 2009 Elson was fired by the university, finishing out the 2009 season. WKU alumnus and Stanford running backs coach Willie Taggart replaced him.

In March 2010, Indiana University head football coach Bill Lynch announced that Elson will be a defensive quality control coach. Coach Lynch noted this would mainly be an administrative role, but that he would be involved in coaching decisions. The Hoosiers made their first road trip of the year to play Elson's former team, the WKU Hilltoppers in Bowling Green, Kentucky.

Elson spent the 2011 football season as defensive coordinator for KHSAA state finalist Franklin-Simpson High School in Franklin, Kentucky.

On January 4, 2012, Elson was announced as the defensive coordinator at New Mexico State University.

On January 13, 2013, Elson was announced as the new secondary coach for the Southern Illinois University Carbondale, where he was a graduate assistant from 94 to 95.  On January 20, 2016, after two years at Southern Illinois, Elson accepted the position as defensive coordinator at Western Illinois under new head coach Charlie Fisher.

Personal life
Elson and his wife, Kathy, have three daughters.

Head coaching record

References

External links
 Purdue profile

1971 births
Living people
American football safeties
Ball State Cardinals football coaches
Butler Bulldogs football players
Indiana Hoosiers football coaches
Marian Knights football coaches
New Mexico State Aggies football coaches
Purdue Boilermakers football coaches
Southern Illinois Salukis football coaches
Western Illinois Leathernecks football coaches
Western Kentucky Hilltoppers football coaches
High school football coaches in Kentucky
Coaches of American football from Indiana
Players of American football from Indianapolis